Railroad Square Art District is an arts, culture and entertainment district of Tallahassee, Florida, located off Railroad Avenue (south of the Amtrak station and FAMU), filled with a variety of metal art sculptures and murals, and stores selling artwork and collectibles. 

Railroad Square is a WWII-era industrial warehouse park turned into am art district with more than 70 shops, galleries, and small businesses. It's known for its small locally owned shops, working artist studios, and alternative art scene. 

In 2021, a skateable art park was added in partnership with Team Pain. The skatepark features Florida's longest snake-run.

History
Railroad Square Art District is the site of the former McDonnell Lumber Company, and most of the warehouses there were originally constructed in the 1940s. The property later became the Downtown Industrial Park. 

In the 1950s it was acquired by The Boynton Family, who still own much of the property today, three generations later. It was the second generation of Boynton owners, Nan Boynton, who was the one responsible for bringing the artists into the park and renaming it "Railroad Square" in the 1980s. The park is now owned by Lily Boynton Kane and Adam Boynton Kane, Nan's children. The site has hosted a microbrewery, rock climbing gym, local coffee shops, art galleries, art studios, vintage shops, and more.  There are currently over 70 tenants of the Railroad Square community, most if not all of which are located within the historic railroad warehouses. 

Railroad Square regularly hosts events called First Fridays: art crawl events with live music and food trucks that take place on the first Friday of every month.

Shopping, Dining, Recreation 

Railroad Square features a great number of local businesses owned and operated by Tallahassee residents. The number of tenants varies, but there is space for 90-100 stores at once. Included in the park’s offerings are entertainment venues, food options, beauty-focused stores, screen printing stores, gift stores and boutiques, and thrift stores, some of which specialize in services and goods specifically for the  LGBTQIA+ community and for individuals with autism. There are also music and recording studios, pet stores, performing arts groups, a virtual reality arcade, a gym, and many other unique businesses.

Railroad Square is located along the Capital Cascades Trail, a long pedestrian and bike path that begins at  Cascades Park. It also features an outdoor event venue called the Art Garden, and a children's playground.

In January of 2019, plans were revealed to construct a  Hyatt House hotel at the entrance of the park. The decision was met with a mixed reaction from the park’s preexisting tenants, who were concerned about a large business moving in. The hotel opened in February of 2021, and in December of 2021, it was sold to the minority-owned hoteliers Noble Investment Group.

Art and Galleries 

A large portion of the spaces at Railroad Square are occupied by art studios. Some of these are owned by singular artists displaying their own work. Others are broader and allow many artists to host displays, including some with a multicultural focus or a focus on showcasing works from disabled artists. There are also a couple of galleries which host painting parties and arts and crafts events.

On August 10, 2021, a mural depicting founder Nan Boynton was revealed on the side of the building housing the Fat Cat Bookstore. It was created by Florida State University art student Matthew Forrest, who has contributed several pieces to the area under the tag ‘briteso’.

Mickee Faust Club

The Mickee Faust Club is a prominent local community theater organization that has been operating in Tallahassee since 1987, and their ‘clubhouse’ is located on the south side of Railroad Square. It was founded by wives Terry Galloway and Donna Nudd out of a desire to find and create an inclusive theater space, and so their productions make an effort to include and feature the LGBTQ+ community and the disabled community (their mascot is performed by Galloway, who is a Deaf lesbian) with a particular focus on seniors and lower-income members of those communities. Their membership and theater workshops are free to the public, and they usually perform two cabaret shows and one irreverent Shakespeare adaptation a year. While their shows are ordinarily comedic, they have been known to feature material covering poignant topics, such as the AIDS crisis or the  Pulse Nightclub shooting.

First Fridays 

On the first Friday of every month, the district hosts the ‘First Friday Gallery Hop’ (known locally as ‘First Fridays’), an event in the evening featuring live music, open galleries, and food trucks. The events have been taking place for over twenty years, and while they were put on hold due to the COVID-19 pandemic, they returned starting June 4, 2021. For the businesses of Railroad Square, the First Friday events are a crucial source of revenue, with one business owner saying they are “when you can usually earn enough to take you through the month”. They take place in the evening- reported hours range from 6-9 PM to 5:45-11 PM, possibly reflecting a change over time or accounting for the hours of individual businesses within the district.

Gallery

References

External links 
Railroad Square Website

Neighborhoods in Tallahassee, Florida
Culture of Tallahassee, Florida
Tourist attractions in Tallahassee, Florida